Abbots Ripton railway station was a  railway station on the East Coast Main Line  in the English county of Cambridgeshire. Although trains still pass on the now electrified railway the station closed in 1958. Due to the position of the station in a cutting, it had two platforms which were staggered. These served the fast lines only, though the goods lines ran around the back of each.

History
The station was opened by the Great Northern Railway (GNR) on 1 November 1885 as Abbotts Ripton. The GNR became part of the London and North Eastern Railway (LNER)
during the Grouping on 1 January 1923. Renamed Abbots Ripton in 1938, the station then passed on to the Eastern Region of British Railways on nationalisation in 1948, and was closed by the British Transport Commission on 15 September 1958.

Abbots Ripton rail disaster

An accident occurred at the future site of the station on 21 January 1876, when the southbound Flying Scotsman express train from Edinburgh to London was involved in a double collision during a blizzard. Heavy snow had frozen around the semaphore signal arms, causing them to stick in the "clear" position, as a result of which the driver of the express was not warned of the presence of a coal train which was backing from the main line into a siding. A collision occurred, and not long after, a northbound express from London to Leeds ran into the wreckage. There were thirteen fatalities, and 53 passengers and 6 traincrew members were injured.

Routes

Notes

References

External links
 Abbot's Ripton station on navigable O. S. map

Disused railway stations in Cambridgeshire
Railway stations in Great Britain opened in 1885
Railway stations in Great Britain closed in 1958
Former Great Northern Railway stations